Stephen Whalen (born 3 May 1982) is a former Scottish professional footballer who played as a forward for Ayr Utd and Livingston.

Club career

Greenock Morton and Livingston
Whalen began his career at Greenock Morton where he scored 8 goals in 45 appearances.  He signed for Livingston in 2001, but left the club without making a single first team appearance.

Alloa and Ayr Utd
During his time at Livi, the forward spent a couple of loan spells at Alloa and Ayr Utd.  He impressed during his loan spell at Somerset Park and the Honest Men signed him permanently in 2003.

Juniors
He joined West of Scotland Football League side Craigmark Burntonians in 2004.

Whalen also had a spell at Irvine Meadow.

References

External links
Stephen Whalen on Soccerbase

1982 births
Living people
Scottish footballers
Scottish Football League players
Association football forwards
Greenock Morton F.C. players
Livingston F.C. players
Ayr United F.C. players
Alloa Athletic F.C. players
Craigmark Burntonians F.C. players
Irvine Meadow XI F.C. players
Footballers from Irvine, North Ayrshire